Clinton Glenn Hart (born July 20, 1977) is a former American football safety in the National Football League (NFL) for the Philadelphia Eagles, San Diego Chargers, and St. Louis Rams. He also was a member of the Tallahassee Thunder, Tampa Bay Storm, Rhein Fire, Amsterdam Admirals and Omaha Nighthawks of the United Football League (UFL). He played college baseball at Central Florida.

Early years
Hart attended South Sumter, where he practiced football and baseball. In football, he was the team's starter at quarterback and safety.

Because of his SAT low score, he didn't receive football college scholarships offers except for an interest to play college football at UCF, he turned it downed instead deciding to play baseball at Central Florida. He did not play college football. He was selected by the Anaheim Angels in the 32nd round of the 2000 Major League Baseball Draft.

Professional career

Tampa Bay Storm
After spending the 2000 season with the Tallahassee Thunder of the af2, Hart played defensive back and wide receiver for the Tampa Bay Storm of Arena Football League in 2001. He finished his only season in the AFL recording three interceptions and 69 tackles on defense and 24 receptions for 242 yards and touchdown on offense.

Philadelphia Eagles
After success in the AFL, the Philadelphia Eagles signed Hart to a contract in 2002 and allocated him to NFL Europe, where he played for the Rhein Fire and Amsterdam Admirals. He spent the final six weeks of the season on the Eagles practice squad.

In 2003, Hart was able to make the roster and started 9 games at safety due to an injury to starter Brian Dawkins. On September 14, 2004, the Eagles waived him.

San Diego Chargers
On September 15, 2004, Hart was claimed off waivers by the San Diego Chargers. Hart played in 14 games for the Chargers in 2004 and was tied with Hanik Milligan for the team lead with in special teams tackles with 15.

In 2005, Hart started 5 of 16 games and recorded 45 tackles and an interception. He also scored two touchdowns on an interception return and an interception by Donnie Edwards who lateralled to him for the score. In 2006, he started one of 16 games, recording 48 tackles and three interceptions.

In 2007, Hart became the Chargers full-time starter at strong safety, starting all 16 games. He finished the season recording a career-high five interceptions and 85 tackles.

On April 7, 2008, the Chargers signed Hart to a five-year extension through 2012. During the 2008 season, he remained the Chargers starter at strong safety, starting in all 14 games he played. He finished the season with 63 tackles and 0 interceptions.

Hart was cut from the Chargers on October 14, 2009.

St. Louis Rams
Hart was signed by the St. Louis Rams on December 8, 2009. He wasn't re-signed after the season.

Personal life
On April 28, 2010, it was reported he was arrested for the battery of his wife after she discovered a female chatting with him on Facebook.  He denied the charges.

In 2017, Hart took the position of Defensive Coordinator at Ocala Christian Academy in Ocala, Florida.

His younger brother, Keanu Neal, played college football at Florida Gators football as a safety and was a 2016 NFL draft prospect selected #17 overall by the Atlanta Falcons.

References

External links
Just Sports Stats

1977 births
Living people
People from Dade City, Florida
Baseball players from Florida
Players of American football from Florida
American football safeties
Tampa Bay Storm players
Amsterdam Admirals players
Philadelphia Eagles players
San Diego Chargers players
St. Louis Rams players
Omaha Nighthawks players
College of Central Florida Patriots baseball players